Raasta is a 2017 Pakistani action thriller film directed by Sahir Lodhi. It stars Sahir Lodhi, Abeer Rizvi, Aijaz Aslam, Shamoon Abbasi, and Naveed Raza in lead roles, alongside Saima Azhar, Mathira and Saeeda Imtiaz in cameo appearances. The film was released on 31 March 2017.

Synopsis
Raasta revolves around two brothers who try to bond and get revenge against the failed political system in Pakistan.

Cast
Sahir Lodhi as Sameer
Aijaz Aslam as Inspector Sultan
Shamoon Abbasi as Shahnawaz Rajpoot 
Naveed Raza as Sherry 
Saima Azhar as Maya
Abeer Rizvi
Nadia as Mona
Esha Noor as Zara
Sana Nawaz as Bhabi
Saniya Mansoor as Zoya
Saleem Mairaj
Saeeda Imtiaz (Cameo appearance)
Mathira as Dancer in the Song ''Pee Lay''
 Ramis Khan as SRK

Production
The shooting of the film began in November 2015 and it was shot in Karachi. The details about the film were revealed in November 2015. The film stars Naveed Raza, Sana Nawaz, Aijaz Aslam, Saleem Mairaj, Shamoon Abbasi and Saima Azhar in pivotal roles. Mathira was chosen to make Appearance in an item Song ''Pee Lay''. This is the debut film of the lead actors Sahir Lodhi, Abeer Rizvi and Saima Azhar.

Soundtrack
The soundtrack of Raasta is composed by Kamran Akhtar and Saji Ali.

Release
The Film was released on 31 March 2017 in Pakistan, USA, UK and UAE. The film came out to be a ''Disaster'' at Box Office with Low Response from audiences, earned only 2.3 million in 5 days and was declared as an expected Flop for the Makers. Raasta Performed Poorly and distributors Suffered Financially. The Action Packed Movie was Taken Off from Cinemas within 2 weeks due to Small Audiences.

Reviews
The Express Tribune did not give the film a rating, commenting: "Once you’re in it, there is no coming out of the half-hearted action sequences, flat dialogue deliveries and the confusing cathartic experience that Sahir Lodhi directorial tries to offer." Hasham Cheema of Dawn described the film as "Hilarious" with high Entertainment Value and Dramatic Scenes, summarising Lodhi's performance: "Unapologetically violent, disproportionately proud, self-righteous, relentless, surreal and Borderline absurd; this film brings together all that I find Profoundly interesting about the Quintessential Pakistani Pop Celebrity."

The movie was heavily criticized and termed a Disaster by many Critics and Bloggers, leading to a public Retort by Lodhi who said their Reviews were Motivated by Personal Bias. The Express Tribune'' quoted a manager of Super Cinemas questioning the Distributors' Decision to Consider the film Suitable for Public Screening, following its Performance. However, the manager also added that he Provided the Morning, Evening and Night Shows to the film to support Pakistani Cinema.

References

External links

2017 action drama films
2017 films
Films set in Karachi
Pakistani action drama films
2010s Urdu-language films
Films about revenge